Charles F. Householder (1855–1908) was a professional baseball player. He played one season in Major League Baseball as a third baseman and outfielder for the Chicago Browns/Pittsburgh Stogies  of the Union Association.

External links

Major League Baseball third basemen
Major League Baseball outfielders
Chicago Browns/Pittsburgh Stogies players
Lynn Live Oaks players
Worcester (minor league baseball) players
Philadelphia Athletics (minor league) players
Camden Merritts players
Richmond Virginians (minor league) players
Oswego Starchboxes players
Syracuse Stars (minor league baseball) players
Wilkes-Barre Coal Barons players
Portland (minor league baseball) players
Portsmouth Lillies players
Lowell Chippies players
Springfield, Ohio (minor league baseball) players
Grand Rapids (minor league baseball) players
Harrisburg Ponies players
Erie (minor league baseball) players
19th-century baseball players
Baseball players from Harrisburg, Pennsylvania
1856 births
1908 deaths